The Purge is an American anthology action horror television series, based on the franchise of the same name and created by James DeMonaco. The first season premiered on USA Network on September 4, 2018, and stars Gabriel Chavarria, Hannah Emily Anderson, Jessica Garza, Lili Simmons, Amanda Warren, Colin Woodell and Lee Tergesen, with Cindy Robinson reprising her role as the voice of the Purge Emergency Broadcast System from the films. 

In November 2018, USA Network renewed the show for a second season, which premiered on October 15, 2019. The second season featured a new cast starring Derek Luke, Max Martini, Paola Núñez and Joel Allen, with Cindy Robinson again reprising her role, this time appearing as character Megan Lewis. In the fictional timeline of the franchise, the first season takes place in 2027, and the second season between 2036 and 2037, thus the series is set between the events of the films Anarchy and Election Year. In May 2020, the series was canceled after two seasons.

Premise
With ties to the films, the series revolves around an alternate dystopian United States ruled by a totalitarian government that sanctions a 12-hour period which legalizes all crimes, including vandalism, theft, arson, and murder.

The first season follows several seemingly unconnected characters as they experience the Purge night of 2027: Miguel Guerrero, a Marine searching for his sister Penelope who has joined a death cult; Jane Barbour, an executive who uses the Purge as an opportunity for revenge; and Jenna and Rick Betancourt, married entrepreneurs who attend a Purge party to seek investment capital from a wealthy Purge supporter.

The second season begins just as an annual Purge night of 2036 is drawing to a close, and follows characters dealing with the consequences of that night and investigating conspiracies in the year before the next purge in 2037. One story involves ex-police officers who have become bank robbers. Another story follows a NFFA detective following a suspicious killing of a scientist friend and discovers many of their peers have also been killed in suspicious circumstances. Other stories include college fraternity members who went out on Purge Night to collect items on a scavenger hunt, before having to defend themselves and dealing with PTSD afterwards, as well as a husband and wife who survive an assailant on Purge Night, only to discover that it was a hitman sent to kill the husband and begin to investigate why. Clear connections between these characters and their stories become apparent as the plot unfolds.

Cast and characters

Season 1

Main
 Gabriel Chavarria as Miguel Guerrero, a US Marine who returns home on Purge Night after receiving a cryptic message from his sister, Penelope
 Hannah Emily Anderson as Jenna Betancourt, an anti-Purge proponent and devoted to charitable causes who is accustomed to locking down on Purge Night. Her choice to venture out for the first time leads to an encounter with violence that forces her to deal with deep truths about herself and her marriage.
 Jessica Garza as Penelope Guerrero, a member of a cult who pledges to be sacrificed but finds her faith tested when exposed to the realities. She is Miguel's sister.
 Lili Simmons as Lila Stanton, a young, rich, and rebellious woman who refuses to fit in with the pro-Purge socialite crowd. Her confidence and charm mask a vulnerability that will be exposed as she attempts to deal with unfinished business before the sun rises.
 Amanda Warren as Jane Barbour, a dedicated and hardworking finance professional who is convinced that she has hit an insurmountable glass ceiling at her firm, so she hires a Purge-assassin
 Colin Woodell as Rick Betancourt. After a lifetime of bootstrapping, he is finally climbing the social ladder, but currying favor with the pro-Purge elite presents unexpected challenges to his marriage, as he and his wife must agree on what moral price they'll pay to achieve the American dream.
 Lee Tergesen as Joe Owens, an armored, masked, and seemingly ordinary man who drives through town, intervening in acts of Purge violence while listening to the taped lectures of a motivational life coach

Recurring
 William Baldwin as David Ryker, the Managing Partner at Jane's investment firm and her boss. Confident and powerful, David leads his team with alacrity and intelligence. He appears to be a big Jane supporter but in fact may be standing in the way of her career advancement. David also harbors a Purge Night secret.
 Reed Diamond as Albert Stanton, one of the New Founding Fathers of America. He is Ellie's husband and Lila's father.
 Fiona Dourif as Good Leader Tavis, a cultist who leads her followers into danger on Purge Night
 Paulina Gálvez as Catalina, Stanton family's maid. She becomes an ally for Jenna.
 Andrea Frankle as Ellie Stanton, one of the New Founding Fathers of America. She is Albert's wife and Lila's mother.
 Jessica Miesel as Alison, one of Jane's subordinates
 Adam Stephenson as Mark Cantoff, one of Jane's subordinates
 Dominic Fumusa as Pete the Cop, a keen-eyed, ex-military man and ex-cop with a mysterious past and a dry sense of humor. He is extremely connected and respected by the community and has his finger on the pulse of the city.
 Dane Rhodes as Carmanuce Cascone, Pete's friend
 Allison King as Eileen, a woman rescued by Joe on Purge night. She is the representative of the factory Joe was working.
 Christopher Berry as Rex, a collector of the Carnival of Flesh
 Garrett Kruithof as Kick Charlie, a man rescued by Joe on Purge night. He is Joe's childhood bully.

Guest
 AzMarie Livingston as Bracka, a Purge mercenary hired by Jane
 Joe Chrest as Ross Bailes, neighbor of Rick and Jenna
 Deneen Tyler as Lorraine, Jane's mother
 Alyshia Ochse as Anya, Jane's co-worker
 Dylan Arnold as Henry Bodreaux, a drug addict and Penelope's ex-boyfriend
 Steve Coulter as John Owens, Joe's father. He used to work with Joe at the factory, but is now gravely ill.
 Kelly Murtagh as Paige, a woman kidnapped by Joe on Purge night

Season 2

Main
 Derek Luke as Marcus Moore, an accomplished professional with a loving wife and a beautiful house whose seemingly perfect life is shattered when an assassin breaks into his house on Purge night
 Max Martini as Ryan Grant, a man who "spent his entire year precisely preparing for a massive once-a-year Purge heist with his long-time crew"
 Paola Núñez as Esme Carmona, a NFFA surveillance employee
 Joel Allen as Ben Gardner, a college student who goes out for the first time on Purge Night

Recurring
 Rochelle Aytes as Michelle Moore, Marcus' second wife
 Connor Trinneer as Curtis, Esme's boss
 Charlotte Schweiger as Vivian Ross, Esme's co-worker
 Jonathan Medina as Tommy Ortiz, part of Ryan Grant's team
 Matt Shively as Turner, Ben's friend and a pledge of Delta Tau Gamma at Cooke University
 Chelle Ramos as Sara Williams, part of Ryan Grant's team
 Jaren Mitchell as Doug Vargas, part of Ryan Grant's team
 Danika Yarosh as Kelen Stewart, Ben's girlfriend and an art history student at Cooke University
 Denzel Whitaker as Darren Moore, a student of Cooke University. He is Marcus's son and Ben's classmate.
 Christine Dunford as Andrea Ziv, a corrupted police captain and former superior of Ryan, Tommy, Sara and Doug
 Devyn Tyler as Tonya, Marcus' first wife and Darren's mother
 Jay Ali as Sam Tucker, Marcus and Michelle's neighbor and April's husband
 Rachel G. Whittle as April Tucker, Marcus and Michelle's neighbor and Sam's wife

Guest
 Cindy Robinson as Megan Lewis, the Purge Emergency Broadcast System announcement voice
 Avis-Marie Barnes as Drew Adams, a professor at Cooke University. She helped Esme to walk out from darkness in the past.
 Geraldine Singer as Alice Grant, Ryan's mother
 Lawrence Kao as Andy Tran, Ben's new friend at Cooke University
 Dermot Mulroney as Bobby Sheridan, a motivational speaker and talk radio host
 Dave Maldonado as Clint, Marcus and Michelle's neighbor. He has a grudge against Marcus.
 Ethan Hawke as James Sandin, a security system designer. Hawke reprises his role from the first film.

Episodes

Season 1 (2018)

Season 2 (2019)

Production

Development
A television series about the formation of the Purge was hinted at by DeMonaco. The series would possibly deal with how the New Founding Fathers were voted to office after overthrowing the U.S. Government during an economic collapse and social unrest and how they ratified the 28th Amendment to the U. S. Constitution as well as devising the Purge. In May 2017, it was reported that USA Network would premiere the series in 2018. The series premiered on September 4, 2018. On November 6, 2018, USA Network renewed the show for a second season which premiered on October 15, 2019. On May 13, 2020, the USA Network canceled the series.

Casting
On February 26, 2018, it was announced that Gabriel Chavarria and Jessica Garza were cast as Miguel and Penelope Guerrero. In March 2018, Amanda Warren and Colin Woodell were cast as Jane Barbour and Rick Betancourt. In April 2018, Lili Simmons, Hannah Emily Anderson, Lee Tergesen and William Baldwin were cast as Lila Stanton, Jenna Betancourt, Joe and David Ryker. In May 2018, Fiona Dourif was cast as Good Leader Tavis. In June 2019, Derek Luke, Max Martini, Paola Núñez, and Joel Allen had been cast as series regulars for the second season.

During a New York Comic Con 2019 interview, Joel Allen commented on the use of The Purge films' God mask in the TV series as "like a gift from the writers" as an actor.

Actress Hannah Emily Anderson reflected on her role as Jenna Betancourt in a July 2020 interview, commenting on The Purge's Season 1 Finale. "It was so satisfying and exhilarating. Colin Woodell and Lee Tergesen were right there with me. We made it as real as we could for ourselves, and everything else faded away. We were in our precious little acting bubble. Those are the best moments."

Filming
Filming for the first season began May 2018.

Reception

Critical response
On the review aggregator website Rotten Tomatoes, the series has an approval rating of 42% based on 38 reviews, with an average rating of 5.51/10. The website's critical consensus reads, "Bloated and boring, The Purge kills its own fleetingly fun premise and proves that not all stories work better on the small screen." Metacritic, which uses a weighted average, assigned a score of 44 out of 100 based on 13 critics, indicating "mixed or average reviews".

Ratings

Accolades
The series was nominated for Best Action-Thriller Television Series at the Saturn Awards in 2019.

Home media
The first season was released on DVD and Blu-ray in Region 1 on January 8, 2019.

The second season was released on DVD and Blu-Ray in Region 1 on March 31, 2020.

Notes

References

External links
 
 

The Purge
2010s American anthology television series
2010s American crime television series
2010s American horror television series
2018 American television series debuts
2019 American television series endings
American action television series
American thriller television series
Dystopian television series
English-language television shows
Horror drama television series
Live action television shows based on films
Television series by Universal Content Productions
Television series created by James DeMonaco
Television shows set in New Orleans
USA Network original programming